Frank L. Hays (January 6, 1922 – January 25, 2003) was an American politician who served as the 35th Lieutenant Governor of Colorado from 1957 to 1959 under Governor Stephen McNichols.

Hays was born in Denver, Colorado on January 6, 1922. He served in the United States Army Air Forces during World War II, then became a lawyer. He served as a justice of the Colorado Supreme Court from 1947 to 1951, and then served three terms in the Colorado House of Representatives, from 1951 to 1957, and was majority floor leader from 1955 to 1957. He later became one of Colorado's first full-time lobbyists. He died on January 25, 2003, in Denver.

References

1922 births
2003 deaths
Republican Party members of the Colorado House of Representatives
Lieutenant Governors of Colorado
Politicians from Denver
20th-century American politicians
United States Army Air Forces personnel of World War II
Justices of the Colorado Supreme Court